Sanjib is a given name, which may refer to:

 Sanjib Chandra Chattopadhyay (1838-1899), Bengali novelist and short story writer
 Sanjib Chattopadhyay (born 1936), Bengali novelist and short story writer
 Sanjib Dey, Indian director of III Smoking Barrels
 Sanjib Sanyal, Indian former cricketer
 Sanjib Sardar, Indian politician
 Sanjib Sarkar, Indian sound designer and composer
 Sanjib Senapati, Indian biophysicist, biochemist, biotechnologist

See also 
 Sanjit